The Joker (Danish: Jokeren) is a 1928 Danish-German silent drama film directed by Georg Jacoby and starring Henry Edwards, Elga Brink, Miles Mander and Renée Héribel. It is based upon the 1927 play The Joker by Noel Scott. The film was also released under the German language title Der Faschingskönig (English: The King of the Carnival).

It was shot at the Grunewald Studios in Berlin as well as on location in Nice. The film's sets were designed by the art director Willi Herrmann.

Cast
Henry Edwards as Mr. Carstairs  
Elga Brink as Gill  
Miles Mander as Mr. Borwick  
Aage Hertel as Jonny  
Renée Héribel as Lady Powder  
Christian Schrøder as James  
Philip Bech as Edward  
Ruth Komdrup as Lou Lou  
Aage Bendixen 
Olga Svendsen 
Gabriel Gabrio as Sir Herbert Powder

References

Bibliography
Hans-Michael Bock and Tim Bergfelder. The Concise Cinegraph: An Encyclopedia of German Cinema. Berghahn Books, 2009.

External links

1928 drama films
Danish drama films
Films of the Weimar Republic
Danish silent films
Films directed by Georg Jacoby
Nordisk Film films
German silent feature films
German black-and-white films
German drama films
Films set in Nice
Films shot in Nice
Silent drama films
1920s German films